John G. Kelton, M.D., FRCPC, C.M.  is a Canadian hematologist and the past Dean of the McMaster University Medical School and the Dean and Vice-President of the McMaster Faculty of Health Sciences. He completed his 15-year term in June 2016 and is currently the Executive Director of the Michael G. DeGroote Initiative for Innovation in Healthcare at McMaster University in Hamilton.  He is an expert on heparin-induced thrombocytopenia. He is known for developing a diagnostic test for heparin-induced thrombocytopenia in 1986.

Education
Kelton graduated medicine cum laude from the Schulich School of Medicine and Dentistry at The University of Western Ontario in 1973. Following graduation he trained in internal medicine and hematology at McMaster University and Duke University School of Medicine. In 1977, he was recruited to McMaster. In 2001, he was made the Dean and Vice-President of the faculty of Health Sciences and the Dean of the medical school.

Career
Kelton is the author of five books, more than eighty book chapters and more than three hundred publications including over fifteen in the New England Journal of Medicine. In 1996, he published a landmark randomized control trial that showed that heparin-induced thrombocytopenia was significantly more common after unfractionated heparin compared to low molecular weight heparin.

Awards
 2015 Prix Galien Canada Prize with Ted Warkentin for significant advances in pharmaceutical research for work on heparin-induced thrombocytopenia
 Jean Julliard Award from the International Society of Blood Transfusion
 Emily Cooley Award from the American Association of Blood Banks
 Bernard L. Schwartz Award from the Scripps Research Institute
 Karl Landsteiner Award from the German Society of Transfusion Medicine and Immunohematology
 Member of the Order of Canada from the Government of Canada

References

Canadian hematologists
Living people
Members of the Order of Canada
Academic staff of McMaster University
Year of birth missing (living people)